Potamonautes emini is a species of crustacean in the family Potamonautidae. It is found in the Rwenzori Mountains between Lake Edward and Lake Albert in the Democratic Republic of the Congo, Rwanda, Tanzania, and Uganda. It is listed as Least Concern on the IUCN Red List.

References

Potamoidea
Freshwater crustaceans of Africa
Taxa named by Franz Martin Hilgendorf
Crustaceans described in 1892
Taxonomy articles created by Polbot